Virpur may refer to the following places in the state of Gujarat, western India:

 Virpur (Rajkot), in Rajkot district
 Virpur-Kherdi State, with seat in the above town
 Virpur (Mahisagar), alias Birpur, in Mahisagar district